The 16th Actors and Actresses Union Awards ceremony was held on 12 February 2007 in Madrid's Palacio Municipal de Congresos. Directed by Mariano de Paco and written by Mariano de Paco, Ignacio García May and Ainhoa Amestoy, the gala was hosted by Jorge Bosso.

In addition to the competitive awards, the association 'Nuestras hijas de regreso a casa' received the '' award, Matilde Conesa the '' award, whereas Nuria Espert scooped the '' career award. The Special Award went to the specialized bookshop Ocho y Medio.

Winners and nominees 
The winners and nominees are listed as follows:

Film

Television

Theatre

Newcomers

References 

Actors and Actresses Union Awards
2007 in Madrid
2007 television awards
2007 film awards
2007 theatre awards
February 2007 events in Europe